Layering is a means of vegetative propagation.

Layering may also refer to:
 
 Layering, a compositional technique in photography
 Layering, the use of abstraction layers in software and communication protocol design
 Layering, a step in the process of money laundering
 Layering, wearing layers of lightweight garments for warmth, known as layered clothing
 Layering (finance), a strategy in high frequency trading
 Layering (linguistics), a principle by which grammaticalisation can be detected
 Surface layering, a quasi-crystalline structure at the surfaces of liquids

See also
 Layer (disambiguation)